Mozambique competed in the 2010 Commonwealth Games held in Delhi, India, from 3 to 14 October 2010. It sent 10 players.

See also
 2010 Commonwealth Games

References

External links 
 Times of india

Nations at the 2010 Commonwealth Games
Mozambique at the Commonwealth Games
Com